Daolio is a surname. Notable people with the surname include:

Augusto Daolio (1947–1992), Italian singer, poet, and painter
Serena Daolio (born 1972), Italian soprano singer

See also
Daolin